Antigonia is a genus of boarfishes, the largest genus in its family. These are deep-water species, generally found at depths below .  Various extinct species were once placed within Antigonia, but have since been removed to Eoantigonia and Proantigonia

Species
The currently recognized species in this genus are:
 Antigonia aurorosea Parin & Borodulina, 1986
 Antigonia capros R. T. Lowe, 1843 (deepbody boarfish)
 Antigonia combatia Berry & Rathjen, 1959 (shortspine boarfish)
 Antigonia emanuela Prokofiev, Psomadakis & Gon, 2020 (Emanuela's boarfish)
 Antigonia eos C. H. Gilbert, 1905
 Antigonia hulleyi Parin & Borodulina, 2005
 Antigonia indica Parin & Borodulina, 1986
 Antigonia kenyae Parin & Borodulina, 2005
 Antigonia malayana M. C. W. Weber, 1913 (Malayan deepsea boarfish)
 Antigonia ovalis Parin & Borodulina, 2006
 Antigonia quiproqua Parin & Borodulina, 2006
 Antigonia rhomboidea McCulloch, 1915 (rhomboidal boarfish)
 Antigonia rubescens (Günther, 1860) (Indo-Pacific boarfish)
 Antigonia rubicunda J. D. Ogilby, 1910 (rosy deepsea boarfish)
 Antigonia saya Parin & Borodulina, 1986
 Antigonia socotrae Parin & Borodulina, 2006
 Antigonia undulata Parin & Borodulina, 2005
 Antigonia xenolepis Parin & Borodulina, 1986

References

Caproidae
Ray-finned fish genera